Auriporia aurulenta is a species of poroid crust fungus. It was described as a new species in 1975. A central European species, it has been recorded from Austria, Czechoslovakia, France, Yugoslavia, South Germany, Switzerland, and the Ukraine. The fungus is recognized in the field by its deep orange-yellow colour that becomes ochre in age. Microscopically, it features thick-walled cystidia that typically measure 20–35 by 8–12 µm.

References

Fomitopsidaceae
Fungi described in 1975
Fungi of Europe